Acacia asparagoides is a shrub belonging to the genus Acacia and the subgenus Phyllodineae. It is native to an area in south eastern New South Wales.

Description
It blooms mostly between August and October producing inflorescences that occur singly in axils and have spherical flower-heads with a diameter of  containing 15 to 30 bright yellow flowers. The flat, smooth, brittle and papery seed pods.

Taxonomy
The species was first formally described by the botanist Allan Cunningham in 1825 as part of the work On the Botany of the Blue Mountains, Geographical Memoirs on New South Wales.  It was reclassified as Racosperma asparagoides by Leslie Pedley in 2003 then transferred back into the genus Acacia in 2006. The specific epithet is taken from the resemblance of the shrub to some species of asparagus.

Distribution
The shrub is found between Newnes Junction and Lawson in the Blue Mountains where it grows in sandy soils over and around sandstone s a part of dry sclerophyll forest less frequently heath-land communities.

See also
 List of Acacia species

References

asparagoides
Flora of New South Wales
Plants described in 1825
Taxa named by Allan Cunningham (botanist)